Sandra Newman (born November 6, 1965, in Boston, Massachusetts) is an American writer. She has a BA from Polytechnic of Central London, and an MA from the University of East Anglia.

Newman's first novel, The Only Good Thing Anyone Has Ever Done, was first published in 2002 and received a nomination for the 2002 Guardian First Book Award. The novel features an American adoptee from Guatemala named Chrysalis Moffat and focuses on events in her and her family's lives using an unusual style reminiscent of notes taken while composing the novel.

Newman's third novel, The Country of Ice Cream Star (2014), was among eighty titles nominated for 2015 Folio Prize, and among twenty works nominated for the 2015 Baileys Women's Prize for Fiction. The novel follows the protagonist, Ice Cream Fifteen Star, through a dystopian future United States while she searches for a cure for her brother's inherited disease.

Her fourth novel, The Heavens (2019), published by Grove Atlantic, tells the story of a woman who lives in the early twenty-first century, but who returns every night in dreams to Elizabethan England, where she lives as Emilia Lanier, a Jewish poet whose circle of acquaintances includes an obscure poet named William Shakespeare. The New York Times Book Review called it “a strange and beautiful hybrid.”

She is the author of one additional novel, Cake (2008); a memoir, Changeling (2010); and a guide to Western literature, The Western Lit Survival Kit: How To Read The Classics Without Fear (2012). She is the co-author of How Not To Write A Novel (2008) and Read This Next (2010).

Her fifth novel, The Men (2022), published by Grove Atlantic, recounts a story in which all people with a Y chromosome vanish from the face of the Earth. The book was controversial, with some critical of its focus on biology and exclusion of trans women. However, in The Telegraph, Claire Allfree cites discussion of trans women in the book, and in Publishers Weekly, David Varno says "The Men is at once accessible and surprisingly complex," and notes that "trans characters do feature in it." In a review for The Times, Jessa Crispin described The Men as "the most ill-conceived and badly executed novel of the year". In Financial Times, Erica Wagner wrote that the novel was a "confused and confusing book, a tangled mess of threads that never knit up into a satisfying whole." In The Spectator, Sarah Ditum called The Men "a gripping, haunting novel," and in The Telegraph, Nina Power called it "compelling and enjoyable."

References 

1965 births
Living people
Alumni of the University of Westminster
Alumni of the University of East Anglia
21st-century American novelists
American women novelists
21st-century American women writers
Women science fiction and fantasy writers